Lima is a locality situated in Malung-Sälen Municipality, Dalarna County, Sweden with 398 inhabitants in 2010.

References 

Populated places in Dalarna County
Populated places in Malung-Sälen Municipality